Cormac Oge Laidir MacCarthy, 10th Lord of Muskerry (1447–1536) was an Irish chieftain, styled Lord of Muskerry. In 1520 he defeated James FitzGerald, 10th Earl of Desmond in the battle of Mourne Abbey.

Birth and origins 

Cormac was born in 1447, most likely at Kilcrea Castle, residence of his parents. He was the son of Cormac Laidir MacCarthy and his wife Mary Fitzmaurice. His father was the 9th Lord of Muskerry. His father's family were the MacCarthys of Muskerry, a Gaelic Irish dynasty that had branched from the MacCarthy-Mor line in the 14th century when a younger son received Muskerry as appanage.

His mother was a daughter of Edmund Fitzmaurice, 8th Baron of Kerry, also called Baron Lixnaw instead of Baron Kerry.

Marriage and children 
MacCarthy married Catherine, daughter of John Barry, 1st Viscount Buttevant.

 
Cormac and Catherine had five sons:
Teige (1472–1565), his successor
Diarmaid
Eoghan
Callaghan (Ceallachan)
Cormac

—and two daughters:
Mary, married James FitzGerald, de jure 12th Earl of Desmond, called "Court Page"
Julia, married three times. First Gerald Fitzmaurice, 15th Baron Kerry (died 1550), secondly Cormac na Haoine MacCarthy Reagh (1490–1567), and thirdly Edmund Butler, 1st/11th Baron Dunboyne (died 1566)

10th Lord of Muskerry 
MacCarthy's father was killed in 1495 by his brother Owen, MacCarthy's uncle, who usurped the lordship. In 1498 MacCarthy, with help from Thomas FitzThomas FitzGerald, future 11th Earl of Desmond, killed Owen. The succession was however denied to him by Cormac, another uncle, for three more years until he succeeded in deposing Cormac in 1501 and eventually acceded as 10th Lord of Muskerry. These two uncles are not counted as lords of Muskerry.

Battle of Mourne 
In September 1520 Muskerry and Donal MacCarthy Reagh helped Thomas FitzGerald, 11th Earl of Desmond, defeat James FitzMaurice FitzGerald, 10th Earl of Desmond in the battle of Mourne. Donal MacCarthy Reagh had married Muskerry's sister Ellen.

In December, together with Piers Butler, 8th Earl of Ormond, they besieged James FitzMaurice FitzGerald, in Dungarvan.

Death 
Muskerry died in 1536 at Kilcrea Castle and was buried in the friary.

Notes and references

Notes

Citations

Sources 

 
 
  – Dacre to Dysart (for Dunboyne)
  – to 1603
 
 
 
 
  – "The bald", earl of Desmond
  – "Court Page"
  – 1501 to 1588
  – Irish stem
 

1447 births
1536 deaths
MacCarthy dynasty